DWIZ (89.3 FM) is a radio station owned and operated by Aliw Broadcasting Corporation. The station's studio and transmitter are located at the 4/F, Bedbox Hotel Bldg., Rizal St., Dagupan. It operates daily from 5:00 AM to 10:00 PM.

The station was established in 2010 as 89dot3 Home Radio with call letters DWQT. It carried an easy listening format. On July 15, 2013, it switched to a news and talk format under the DWIZ branding, having its official launch on July 25. It was headed by former DZRH anchor Andy Vital.

References

Radio stations in Dagupan
Radio stations established in 2010